Live Stages is a live album by Vertical Horizon, released by Rhythmic Records in early 1997, and later re-released by RCA Records. This album was recorded live at Ziggy's in Winston-Salem, North Carolina. It featured mostly songs from the band's second album, Running on Ice, (and "On the Sea" from There and Back Again), as well as new material. This was the first Vertical Horizon album to feature Scannell more prominently on electric guitar, and also the first to include drummer Ed Toth. Ryan Fisher played bass.

Track listing
"The Man Who Would Be Santa" (Scannell) - 5:44
"The Ride" (Kane) - 3:31
"Falling Down" (Moylan/Scannell) - 5:15
"On the Sea" (Scannell) - 6:24
"Japan" (Kane) - 4:52
"It's Only Me" (Scannell) - 5:00
"Candyman" (Kane) - 4:20
"Fragments" (Scannell) - 4:44
"The Unchosen One" (Kane) - 5:19
"Heart in Hand" (Scannell) - 7:12
"Wash Away" (Kane) - 12:23
"Great Divide" (Scannell) - 4:25

Vertical Horizon albums
1997 live albums